Tonfanau railway station is a railway stop that serves Tonfanau in Gwynedd, Wales. The station is located alongside the ruins of the army base it once served and only a couple of occupied buildings can be found within the surrounding area.

History
The station, which was opened by the Cambrian Railways, first appeared in  Bradshaw in July 1896. Due to the deteriorating condition of the platforms, British Rail had considered withdrawing services as from 14 May 1984, but the station was reprieved with minimum maintenance on the grounds of 'educational journeys and the occasional passenger'.

The question of closure was revisited by British Rail in the 1990s when it requested the permission of the Secretary of State for Transport to close Tonfanau and three other Cambrian Coast stations (namely Abererch, Llandecwyn and Tygwyn). Their winter 1995/96 timetable featured only one northbound and three southbound trains Mondays to Saturdays, with a note that the service may be withdrawn before 1 June 1996. Permission for the closure was refused and the station structure has had to be upgraded to meet modern standards with a new platform, signage and platform lighting. Unusually, the remote location of the station relative to mains services has led to its lighting being powered by its own miniature wind turbine.

Services
Trains stop on request.

References

External links

Tonfanau railway station's entry on the National Monuments Record of Wales (NMRW)'s website
The railway bridge over the Afon Dysynni on the NMRW's website

Railway stations in Gwynedd
DfT Category F2 stations
Former Cambrian Railway stations
Railway stations in Great Britain opened in 1895
Railway stations in Great Britain closed in 1896
Railway stations in Great Britain opened in 1897
Railway stations served by Transport for Wales Rail
Railway request stops in Great Britain
Llangelynin, Gwynedd